J. M. Weatherwax High School, commonly referred to as Aberdeen High School, is a four-year public high school located in Aberdeen, Washington, the flagship of the Aberdeen School District. The AHS mascot is the Bobcat.

Demographics 
As of the 2012–2013 school year, there were 868-926 students enrolled, 52.3% of which were male, and 47.7% female. 65.2% of the students were White, 22.6% Hispanic/Latino, 3.8% American Indian, 6.2% Asian-American, and 0.8% African American. There were 52 classroom teachers, for an average of 16.7 students per teacher in May 2013.

Sports 
Aberdeen competes in WIAA Class 2A, and is a member of the Evergreen Conference in District Four. The following sports are offered:

Boys' sports:
 Football
 Baseball
 Basketball
 Soccer
 Wrestling
 Tennis
 Cross Country
 Track and Field
 Golf
 Swimming

Girls' sports:
 Basketball
 Fastpitch
 Volleyball
 Soccer
 Golf
 Swimming
 Track and Field
 Cross Country
 Wrestling
 Tennis
 Bowling

Fire 

On Saturday, 5 January 2002, the Weatherwax building of Aberdeen High School, one of Aberdeen's most historic buildings (built in 1909), burned to the ground just after midnight. The Weatherwax building housed the school library, counseling office, and many classrooms. Students were spread out over the remaining campus until the new school was built.

The grand opening of the new building and official dedication ceremony was held on August 25, 2007. The new high school building is now open for the school year, starting 4 September 2007. Parts of the masonry from the original Weatherwax building have been incorporated into the walls of the current one, including an old concrete sign reading "J. M. Weatherwax" inside the main entrance.

Notable alumni 

 Mark Bruener -  Former NFL football player
 Dale Crover - Melvins drummer
 Bryan Danielson - Professional wrestler, 5-time WWE Champion
 Chris Freeman - Pansy Division bass guitarist
 Mel Ingram -  Former MLB player (Pittsburgh Pirates)
 Krist Novoselic - Nirvana bass guitarist, Sweet 75, Eyes Adrift
 Lou Stewart - prominent labor leader
 Douglas D. Osheroff - Nobel Prize in Physics for the discovery of superfluidity in the isotope helium-3
 Wesley Carl Uhlman - Mayor of Seattle, 1969–1978; youngest mayor of Seattle
 Hank Woon - Screenwriter, Author, Game Designer

References

External links 
 Aberdeen High School website
 GSHL Football - Aberdeen High School
 OSPI school report card 2012-13

Aberdeen, Washington
High schools in Grays Harbor County, Washington
Educational institutions established in 1909
Public high schools in Washington (state)
1909 establishments in Washington (state)